is a retired Japanese breaststroke swimmer who won the 100 m and 200 m events at the 1958 Asian Games in Tokyo. She competed in the 200 m breaststroke at the 1960 Summer Olympics, but failed to reach the final, while her 4×100 metres medley relay team finished seventh.

References

1938 births
Living people
Japanese female breaststroke swimmers
Swimmers at the 1960 Summer Olympics
Olympic swimmers of Japan
Asian Games gold medalists for Japan
Medalists at the 1958 Asian Games
Asian Games medalists in swimming
Swimmers at the 1958 Asian Games